Angelo Gregorio (born 11 April 1991) is an Italian footballer who plays as a defender for Franciacorta FC in Serie D.

Career

Early career
Gregorio started his career in A.C. Cesena. He was the member of reserve B in 2007–08 season for Berretti reserve league. Reserve A and B merged in 2008–09 season, as Cesena first team was relegated at the end of 2007–08 Serie B, thus the reserve A was no longer eligible to national "spring" league. Gregorio remained in the reserve for 2008–09 season. He followed the under-20 reserve returned to the spring league in 2009–10 season, but only played 13 times.

Gregorio spent 2010–11 Serie D season in Santarcangelo along with Simone Tonelli. He won the Group F champion and promoted to professional league.

Bologna–Cesena swap
On 29 June 2011, one day before the closure of 2010–11 financial year, Cesena formed two swap deals with Bologna F.C. 1909, which Gregorio was transferred to the capital of Emilia along with Kadir Caidi in co-ownership deal for €1 million and €750,000 respectively. At the same time, Giacomo Bassoli and Jacopo Luppi moved to Romagna in the same formula. The deal made the clubs had a financial boost instead of immediate impact on the squad. La Repubblica had criticized Bologna's swap deal with Livorno and Chievo in the same month were exploit to the transfer market to fix the balance sheet.

Lega Pro loans
Gregorio left for Italian fourth division newcomer Santarcangelo in July 2011, along with K.Caidi (both from Bologna/Cesena), G.Bassoli (from Cesena/Bologna), Rivolino Gavoci, Nicola Del Pivo and Daniele Ferri (Cesena only). The club also renewed the loan of former Cesena teammate Simone Tonelli, however now co-owned between Vicenza and Cesena. In June 2012 the ownerships were renewed. Gregorio left for Pontedera in 2012–13 Lega Pro Seconda Divisione. In June 2013 both clubs gave up the remain 50% registration rights on their youth products. On 18 July 2013 he was signed by Teramo.

Footnotes

References

External links
 Football.it Profile 
 

Italian footballers
A.C. Cesena players
Santarcangelo Calcio players
Bologna F.C. 1909 players
U.S. Città di Pontedera players
S.S. Teramo Calcio players
A.C. Bra players
A.C. Tuttocuoio 1957 San Miniato players
Serie C players
Serie D players
Association football defenders
1991 births
Living people